Global Pensions magazine was a monthly Incisive Media publication that served the institutional pensions industry and focused on managing risk and investment returns. The magazine was part of MSM International Ltd. until late 2006 when it was acquired by Incisive Media. The magazine was based in London. It was previously published weekly. It was edited by Raquel Pichardo-Allison.

In November 2011, Incisive Media announced the closure of the magazine. The readers are urged to get the same news from Professional Pensions.

References

External links
 Global Pensions

Business magazines published in the United Kingdom
Monthly magazines published in the United Kingdom
Defunct magazines published in the United Kingdom
Magazines with year of establishment missing
Magazines disestablished in 2011
Professional and trade magazines
Weekly magazines published in the United Kingdom
Magazines published in London